Frédéric Chaslin (born 1963, in Paris) is a French conductor, composer and pianist. He recently joined the prestigious Music publishing house Universal Edition in Vienna.

Early Life and Education 

The son of an architect, Chaslin studied at the Conservatoire de Paris, where he won first prizes in harmony, counterpoint, fugue, piano accompaniment, vocal direction, and orchestration.  He later studied at the Mozarteum University of Salzburg, where his mentors included Paul von Schilawsky.

Conductor 

In 1989, Chaslin became an assistant conductor to Daniel Barenboim at the Orchestre de Paris and at the Bayreuth Festival.  In 1991, he held a similar post with Pierre Boulez at the Ensemble Intercontemporain from 1989 to 1991. Boulez gave him his first concerts at an international level in Roma (July 1991) and at the Festival Wien Modern (19 October 1991).  Chaslin was music director of the Opera de Rouen from 1991 to 1994.  He was chief conductor of the Jerusalem Symphony Orchestra (JSO) from 1999 to 2002, between the music directorships of David Shallon and Leon Botstein.  From 1999 to 2005, he was a resident conductor of the Vienna State Opera.  He served as Generalmusikdirektor of the Nationaltheater Mannheim from 2005 to 2006.  In 2010, Chaslin was re-appointed to the JSO as its next music director, effective September 2012, with an initial contract of three years.
 
Chaslin first conducted in the United States at the Metropolitan Opera in November 2002.  In July 2009, he made his conducting debut at Santa Fe Opera (SFeO), in the first production of La traviata to feature Natalie Dessay as Violetta.  In May 2010, SFeO announced the appointment of Chaslin as the company's second chief conductor in its history, effective October 1, 2010, with an initial contract of three years.  He resigned his position with SFeO at the end of August 2012.

After making his house debut in the 1996/1997 season, Frédéric Chaslin became a fixture at the Wiener Staatsoper, where within 20 years he conducted more than 200 performances.

Frédéric Chaslin made his debut at the Semperoper Dresden in the 2016/2017 season with a new production of Les contes d'Hoffmann.

Recent engagements as a conductor also include, among many symphony concerts all over the world, several opera productions at the Teatro Comunale di Bologna (Carmen, Aida) and Cavalleria rusticana/Pagliacci) and at Opéra Royal de Wallonie (La Bohème, Mignon and Lakmé). He also led productions such as Werther at the Royal Opera House Muscat and in Bergen, Les contes d'Hoffmann in Copenhagen, Don Giovanni at the Chorégies d'Orange, Il barbiere di Siviglia in Savonlinna, Faust at the Teatro La Fenice, Carmen in Monte Carlo, Tosca at La Monnaie in Brussels, Die tote Stadt at the Enescu Festival in Bucharest, La fille du régiment at the Teatro Lirico di Cagliari and a new production of La Gioconda at the Teatro alla Scala,where he leads a new staging of Les contes d'Hoffmann in 2023.

Composer 

Chaslin's compositions include the Chagall Suite for orchestra, Diva Dance for the film The Fifth Element, songs and lieder, and several operas, including adaptations of Wuthering Heights (libretto by P.H. Fisher) and of S.P. Somtow's Vampire Junction.  He has also written a book on music, La Musique dans Tous les Sens (scheduled English title, Music in Every Sense), published in 2009.

Chaslin also composed entire cycles based on poetry by Robert Frost. All three cycles have been performed with the Jerusalem Symphony Orchestra between 2012 and 2015, and are available on YouTube for listening. Chaslin wrote a song cycle after Jean Cocteau for soprano, and has composed a musical based on Monte Cristo, commissioned by Plácido Domingo.
In January 2023, the album Rendez-vous was released on the Aparté label. It combines original music compositions by Frédéric Chaslin on poems by Boris Vian, Alain Duault and Jean Cocteau, with short stories written by Arièle Butaux and read by Pierre Arditi. Composed for a piano-voice-trumpet ensemble, Frédéric Chaslin's melodies (also on piano) are performed by soprano Julie Cherrier-Hoffmann and trumpet player Lucienne Renaudin Vary.

Author 

Chaslin's first novel, "Being Gustav Mahler", was released in 2017 by Fayard Publishing, . Available on France-Empire is "La Musique Dans tous les Sens", released in 2009.

Recordings 

Recordings include Diana Damrau singing his "Vocalise" from "Wuthering Heights" (Warner) and an entire album for Sony Classical with Sonya Yoncheva, "Paris mon Amour". 
Recently, Frédéric Chaslin has conducted the solo albums of Rachel Willis-Sørensen and Ludovic Tézier for Sony Classical as well as Benjamin Bernheim for Deutsche Grammophone. On Aparté, Julie Cherrier-Hoffmann's album "Chansons Pour Elle", the albums "Cellopera", opera arias arranged by Chaslin with Ophélie Gaillard playing the cello and "Rendez-vous" have been published.

Personal quote: "I'm happy being busy, as long as I'm busy being happy".

References

External links
 Rayfield Allied - Agent site
 Il Trittico agency biography of Chaslin
 Klassik Heute German-language timeline biography of Chaslin
 Chaslin featured in Opera Lively
 Jerusalem Symphony Orchestra biography of Chaslin

1963 births
French male conductors (music)
Living people
Musicians from Paris
French male composers
Conservatoire de Paris alumni
Mozarteum University Salzburg alumni
20th-century French conductors (music)
20th-century French male musicians
21st-century French conductors (music)
21st-century French male musicians